was a former province of Korea under Japanese rule, with its capital at Taikyū (contemporary Daegu, South Korea). The province consisted of what is now the South Korean province of North Gyeongsang.

Population

Number of people by nationality according to the 1936 census:

 Overall population: 2,454,275 people
 Japanese: 49,887 people
 Koreans: 2,402,970 people
 Other: 1,418 people

Administrative divisions

The following list is based on the administrative divisions of 1945:

Cities

Taikyū (大邱) - (capital): Daegu (대구). present Daegu Metropolitan City.

Counties 

Tatsujō (달성)
Gun'i (군위)
Gijō (의성)
Antō (안동)
Seishō (청송)
Eiyō (영양)
Eitoku (영덕)
Geijitsu (영일. 현 포항)
Keishū (경주)
Eisen (영천)
Keizan (경산)
Seidō (청도)
Kōrei (고령)
Seishū (성주)
Shikkoku (칠곡)
Kinsen (김천)
Zenzan (선산. 현 구미)
Shōshū (상주)
Bunkei (문경)
Reisen (예천)
Eishū (영주)
Hōka (봉화)

Islands
Utsuryō Island (울릉)

Provincial governors

The following people were provincial ministers before August 1919. This was then changed to the title of governor.

See also
Provinces of Korea
Governor-General of Chōsen
Administrative divisions of Korea

Korea under Japanese rule
Former prefectures of Japan in Korea